Santiago Guido Visentin (born 5 March 1999) is an Argentine football player. He plays for Italian club Cittadella. He also holds Italian citizenship.

Club career
He made his professional Serie C debut for Virtus Verona on 26 January 2020 in a game against Feralpisalò.

On 1 August 2021, he signed with Serie B club Crotone for the term of three years, with an option to extend for fourth year. He made his Serie B debut for Crotone on 22 August 2021 against Como.

On 31 January 2022, he joined Cittadella.

Personal life
On 31 January 2023, Visentin was charged with gang rape and sentenced to six years in prison together with four other former teammates of his from his time at Virtus Verona.

References

External links
 

1999 births
Footballers from Rosario, Santa Fe
Argentine people of Italian descent
Living people
Argentine footballers
Association football defenders
Pordenone Calcio players
A.C. Belluno 1905 players
Deportivo Maipú players
Virtus Verona players
F.C. Crotone players
A.S. Cittadella players
Serie D players
Serie C players
Serie B players
Argentine expatriate footballers
Expatriate footballers in Italy
Argentine expatriate sportspeople in Italy